The Generators are a punk rock band formed in 1997 in Los Angeles, created as a response to the breakup of the 90s punk rock group Schleprock. The original lineup was composed of Doug Kane on vocals, Mike Snow and Eric Ortega (Sir Doosky) on guitars, Ernie Berru on the drums and Rich Santia on bass.

History

The Generators' first album, Welcome To The End, was released by Los Angeles–based Triple XXX Records in 1997. After positive reviews of their debut album, they turned out a 7-song EP Ninety Nine and 2 more full-length albums by 2001, Burning Ambition on Urgent Music Ltd. and Tyranny on TKO records, and another 8-song EP called State of the Nation on TKO.

Between 2003 and 2009, they released 4 more full-length records; Excess Betrayal...And Our Dearly Departed, The Winter Of Discontent, The Great Divide, and Between The Devil And The Deep Blue Sea. All 4 albums were primarily released in Europe on People Like You Records, and were not easy to find in the United States unless imported or from the band themselves at a show.

In 2011, the band recorded and released their 8th studio album called Last Of The Pariahs with DC-Jam Records, receiving positive reviews. They followed the release with tours in the US and Europe.

The group released another 6-song EP with Concrete Jungle records in 2013 called The Deconstruction of Dreams.

In 2013,the Generators joined Randale Records with whom their latest full-length album "Life Gives-Life Takes" was released in the spring of 2014. In the summer of 2014 the band played several gigs, festivals, and radio shows to support their latest release, as well as releasing music videos. 
The Generators have had a long international touring and recording career that requires availability and commitment. Due to committments to international touring and studio recording, band members who could no longer meet time requirements have departed from the group.

Kane and Snow were involved in a side project called the Bedlam Knives who released a 7-inch on Dr. Strange Records. Their sound is similar to The Generators and they have since broken up.

2015 saw the re-mastering and re-release of their first 2 albums which had both been long out of print.  "Welcome To The End" was released by Dr. Strange Records and "Burning Ambition" by Crowd Control Media. Both releases had new artwork and newly added bonus tracks.

In 2016, the band released a retrospective album called "Earn Your Stripes" on Randale records.  It included many of the band's favorite hits over their almost 20-year history as well as multiple new songs.  They also released a split EP with the British band Crashed Out called "Blood, Sweat, & Glory", followed by another tour.

In 2017 the band released a new 7” single called “Street Justice” on Pirates Press Records and Randale Records, and announced the completion of a new album.  In 2018 they released their 10th studio album “Broken Stars & Crooked Stripes” on Randale Record and toured again through the US and Europe.

After 20+ plus years of constant touring, over 20 releases including 10 full length LPs, The Generators took a hiatus in 2019, being inactive for the longest stretch of the band's career.  
Kane reunited with his 80s Oi! band Doug & The Slugz and began touring and recording with them during the Generators' hiatus.  They have released several 7”s of re-recordings of their original songs from the 80s plus an LP. 
The Generators announced they would return to the scene for Rebellion Fest in Europe in 2020.

2022 Reunion 
On September 20th, 2022, the band announced via their social media platforms the reunion of the original 1997 founding member line up. The band stated they would be announcing tour dates in 2023.

Discography 

 Welcome to the End (1997), Triple X Records, US
 Ninety-Nine (1999), Outcast Records/ Triple X Records, Europe
 Burning Ambition (2000), Urgent Music Ltd. US / People Like You, Europe & Japan
 "Dead at 16 7-inch, TKO Records
 Tyranny (2001), TKO Records US / People Like You, Europe & Japan
 State of the Nation (2002), TKO Records/ Dead Beat, US
 "Sounds of the Street Vol. 2: Split CD w/ Vicious Rumors"
 From Rust to Ruin, TKO Records (compilation: greatest hits album)
 "Riverboat Gamblers split 7-inch"
 Excess, Betrayal...And Our Dearly Departed (2003)People Like You, Europe & Japan, Fiend Music, US
 The Winter of Discontent (2006), People Like You, Europe & Japan, Sailor's Grave, US
 The Great Divide (2007), People Like You, Europe & Japan
 Between the Devil and the Deep Blue Sea (2009), People Like You, Europe & Japan
  You Against You 7-inch
  Last Of The Pariahs  (2011), IHP Records, Europe & Japan, DC Jam, US
  3 of a Kind  (2012), Split with Sledgeback and C.A.F.B.
  The Deconstruction of Dreams  (Concrete Jungle Records, 2013)
  Life Gives-Life Takes  (Randale Records, 2014)
  Earn Your Stripes  (Randale Records, 2016)
  Blood, Sweat & Glory  spit EP w/ Crashed Out (Randale Records/Longshot Music, 2016)

Filmography
 Where The Bad Boys Rock 2004 (Live DVD) (2004), People Like You Records
 Where The Bad Boys Rock 2005'' (Live DVD) (2005), People Like You Records

References

External links 

 
 Sailor's Grave Records site
 People Like You Records site
 TKO Records Records site
 [ Allmusic biography]
 Interview /Totalrock.hu/ Gabor Hun of Sledgeback interviewed Doug Dagger singer

Punk rock groups from California
Musical groups from Los Angeles